|}

The Musidora Stakes is a Group 3 flat horse race in Great Britain open to three-year-old fillies. It is run over a distance of 1 mile, 2 furlongs and 56 yards at York in May.

History
The event is named after Musidora, the Yorkshire-trained winner of the 1,000 Guineas and Epsom Oaks in 1949. Established in 1961, it serves as a leading trial for the Oaks. The first running was won by Ambergris.

The present race grading system was introduced in 1971, and the Musidora Stakes was given Group 3 status.

In total, seven winners of the race have achieved victory in the Oaks. The first was Noblesse in 1963, and the most recent was Snowfall in 2021. The 2015 winner, Star of Seville, won the Prix de Diane, the French equivalent of the Oaks.

The Musidora Stakes is currently held on the opening day of York's three-day Dante Festival meeting. It is run the day before the Dante Stakes.

Records

Leading jockey (6 wins):
 Frankie Dettori – Bahr (1998), Punctilious (2004), Star of Seville (2015), So Mi Dar (2016), Shutter Speed (2017), Emily Upjohn (2022)

Leading trainer (9 wins):
 Henry Cecil – Fatah Flare (1985), Indian Skimmer (1987), Diminuendo (1988), Snow Bride (1989), All at Sea (1992),  Style (1996), Reams of Verse (1997), Passage of Time (2007), Aviate (2010)

Winners

See also
 Horse racing in Great Britain
 List of British flat horse races

References

 Paris-Turf:
 Racing Post:

 galopp-sieger.de – Musidora Stakes.
 ifhaonline.org – International Federation of Horseracing Authorities – Musidora Stakes (2019).
 pedigreequery.com – Musidora Stakes – York.
 

Flat horse races for three-year-old fillies
York Racecourse
Flat races in Great Britain
1961 establishments in England
Recurring sporting events established in 1961